Origin is the seventh studio album by Norwegian heavy metal band Borknagar. Origin explores the band's more progressive and traditional elements and is primarily an acoustic effort.

Bassist Jan Erik "Tyr" Tiwaz is featured on the album following his brief departure during the recording sessions for the band's previous release Epic.

"Oceans Rise" is an acoustic remake of the song of the same name from the 1998 album The Archaic Course.

Track listing

Credits

Borknagar
Andreas Hedlund (credited as "Vintersorg") – lead vocals and choirs, electric guitar, keyboards
Øystein G. Brun – acoustic guitar, electric guitar, high string guitar
Lars A. Nedland – backing vocals, lead vocals (on "White"), synthesizers, Hammond organ, grand piano, string and flute arrangements
Asgeir Mickelson – drums, percussion

Additional Musicians
Jan Erik Tiwaz (credited as "Tyr") – bass guitar, fretless bass
Sareeta – violin
Thomas Nilsson – cello
Steinar Ofsdal – bamboo flutes, recorder

Additional personnel
Christophe Szpajdel – logo

References

External links
Borknagar-Origin (2006 7th Album at the official Borknagar Website)

Borknagar albums
2006 albums
Century Media Records albums